Q22 may refer to:
 Q22 (New York City bus), a bus route in Queens
 Q22 (building), a skyscraper in Warsaw
 Al-Hajj, the 22nd surah of the Quran
 , a repair ship of the Argentine Navy
 Chery Q22, a Chinese minivan
 , a Naïade-class submarine